The men's 200 metres event at the 1997 Summer Universiade was held on 26 and 27 August at the Stadio Cibali in Catania, Italy.

Medalists

Results

Heats
Wind:Heat 1: +1.3 m/s, Heat 5: +0.1 m/s, Heat 7: +1.5 m/s, Heat 9: +2.2 m/s

Quarterfinals
Wind:Heat 1: +1.3 m/s, Heat 2: +1.8 m/s, Heat 3: +1.5 m/s, Heat 4: +0.6 m/s

Semifinals
Wind:Heat 1: -0.7 m/s, Heat 2: -0.4 m/s

Final

Wind: -0.3 m/s

References

Athletics at the 1997 Summer Universiade
1997